Bill or William Pattinson may refer to: 
 Bill Pattinson (rugby league, born 1945), English rugby league player
 Bill Pattinson (rugby league, born 1954), English rugby league player
 William Frederick Pattinson, Australian doctor and businessman